Justin Anderson may refer to:

 Justin Anderson (baseball) (born 1992), American baseball player
 Justin Anderson (basketball) (born 1993), American basketball player
 Justin Anderson (linebacker) (born 1991), American football linebacker
 Justin Anderson (offensive lineman) (born 1988), American football guard
 Justin Anderson (running back) (born 1986), American football running back for the Northern Illinois Huskies
 Justin Anderson (film director) (born 1967), British film director and screenwriter